Kamsar is a city in Guinea.

Kamsar may also refer to:

 Dildarnagar Kamsar, a region in Uttar Pradesh, India
 Kamsar, Gilan, a village in Gilan Province, Iran
 Qamsar, a village in Isfahan province, Iran
 Kamsar (Kamo Sahakyan) (born 1961), Algerian painter